Oxyropsis acutirostra is a species of armored catfish native to Brazil, Colombia and Venezuela, where it occurs in the Orinoco and Negro River basins.  This species grows to a length of  SL.

References
 

Hypoptopomatini
Freshwater fish of Brazil
Freshwater fish of Colombia
Fish of Venezuela
Taxa named by Paulo de Miranda-Ribeiro
Fish described in 1951